The Liberia River is a river in the northwestern Guanacaste Province of Costa Rica. It rises on the slopes of Rincón de la Vieja Volcano (1,916 m) in the Cordillera Central and follows a southwesterly course to the town of Liberia.

Further downstream, the river joins the Tempisque and enters the Gulf of Nicoya via the Colorado Gulf.

References

Rivers of Costa Rica